BC Enisey is a Russian professional basketball team from the city of Krasnoyarsk, Siberia, Russia. Since the 2011–12 season, Enisey plays its national domestic league games in the VTB United League. The team colors are blue and white. The club's full name is Basketball Club Enisey Krasnoyarsk.

History
Enisey Krasnoyarsk was founded as Polytechnic, and played its games at the Krasnoyarsk State Technical University. The team started off in the lower leagues of the Soviet Union, and its best achievement was winning the USSR Cup for teams in Siberia in 1988. In the 1997–98 season, the team played at the highest Russian level for the first time, when it played in the Russian Super League 1. However, the club was relegated immediately, and the next comeback of the club to Russian the highest level was in 2007, when the team was promoted again.

In the 2009–10 season, Enisey made its first appearance in a European-wide competition, when it competed in the FIBA EuroChallenge. In the 2015–16 season, Enisey had a chance to win a European trophy, after it had reached the 2016 FIBA Europe Cup Final Four. After two losses, Enisey finished in fourth place.

Arena
Enisey plays its home games in the Arena Sever, which has a capacity of 4,100 people.

Trophies
Russian Super League 2
Champions (1): 2007
Runners-up (1): 2006

Season by season

Players

Current roster

Depth chart

Notable players

References

External links

Official site 
Other team site 
Eurobasket.com Team Info

Basketball teams in Russia
Sport in Krasnoyarsk
Basketball teams in the Soviet Union
Basketball teams established in 1993
1993 establishments in Russia